The Sherwood-Parkdale Metros were a Canadian Junior ice hockey team from Sherwood, Prince Edward Island.  They were one-time Centennial Cup National finalists.

History
The Sherwood-Parkdale Metros were founded in the early to mid-1970s as members of Prince Edward Island's Island Junior Hockey League.  They were a Tier II Junior "A" club and were eligible for the Centennial Cup.

In 1979, the Metros were the top of the Island Junior Hockey League.  They ended up winning the Eastern Canada Junior A championship and entered into the 1979 Centennial Cup in Prince Albert, Saskatchewan.  The Metros were up against the Central Champion Guelph Platers of the Ontario Provincial Junior A Hockey League and the Western Champion Prince Albert Raiders of the Saskatchewan Junior Hockey League.  In their first game they lost to Prince Albert 7–2, but beat Guelph 6–5 in the second game.  They lost their third game to Prince Albert 8–6.  The fourth game was do-or-die, the winner went to the final while the loser went home.  The Metros were victorious as they beat Guelph 5–4 to move on to a one-game final for the national championship against the Raiders.  The Metros took the Raiders to overtime in the final, but fell 5–4. 

In 1980, again the Metros won the IJHL.  They won the Eastern Canadian championship and moved on to the 1980 Centennial Cup in North York, Ontario.  They started out the round robin with a 7–6 double overtime win over the North York Rangers on the OPJHL.  Then they played Brent Sutter and the Red Deer Rustlers of the Alberta Junior Hockey League, losing 6–0.  In the third game they lost to North York 4–3 to set up a fourth game that would either make or break the Metros.  They forced overtime against the Rustlers, but lost 7–6 in the second period of extra time—ending their tournament. 

In 1989, the team changed its name to the Sherwood-Parkdale Kings.  In 1991, the Summerside Western Capitals and Charlottetown Abbies vacated the Island Junior Hockey League to join the Metro Valley Junior Hockey League in Nova Scotia, thus creating the Maritime Junior A Hockey League.  The Kings folded.

Season-by-Season record

See also
List of ice hockey teams in Prince Edward Island

External links
Hockey PEI Website
MHL Website

Maritime Junior Hockey League teams
Ice hockey teams in Prince Edward Island
1991 disestablishments in Prince Edward Island
Sports clubs disestablished in 1991
1970s establishments in Prince Edward Island
Sports clubs established in the 1970s